Dihydroimidazol-2-ylidene is a hypothetical organic compound with formula C3H6N2. It would be a heterocyclic compound, formally derived from imidazolidine with two hydrogen atoms removed from carbon number 2, leaving two vacant chemical bonds — which makes it a carbene.

Although carbenes in general are extremely short-lived, some derivatives of this compound are surprisingly stable, and form an important class of the persistent carbenes. They include the first stable carbenes postulated (but not isolated) by Hans-Werner Wanzlick around 1960.

They also include an example of the (saturated) imidazolin-2-ylidene (carbene) reported by A.J. Arduengo in 1995.

References

Carbenes
Imidazolines
Hypothetical chemical compounds